Karl Steinhoff (November 24, 1892 – July 19, 1981) was a Minister-president (Ministerpräsident) of the German state (Land) of Brandenburg, then part of East Germany, and later served as East Germany's Minister of the Interior.

Biography
Born in Herford, Steinhoff studied law from 1910 through 1921 at the Universities of Freiburg, Munich, Königsberg, Berlin, and Münster, earning his doctorate in 1921. From 1921 to 1923, he was active in the Ministry of the Interior and Justice; in 1924 served as Legation Secretary (Legationssekretär) of the Saxon legation in Berlin; in 1925-26 as a government advisor (Regierungsrat) in the administration (Amtshauptmannschaft) of Zittau; in 1927–28 as district chief (Landrat) of Zeitz; and later as a vice president (Regierungsvizepräsident) in Gumbinnen and vice president (Vize-Oberpräsident) in Königsberg.

Politically, he had joined the Social Democratic Party of Germany (SPD) in 1923. Amidst the turmoil of the early 1930s (see Nazi Germany), he was given time off in 1932 and dismissed from government service in 1933. From 1940 to 1945, during World War II, he served as lawyer for a cardboard-box wholesale business in Berlin.

At the end of the war in 1945, he became president of the provincial administration (Provinzialverwaltung) of Brandenburg. He joined the Socialist Unity Party of Germany (SED) in 1946, and from 1946 to 1949 served as Brandenburg's Minister-President and as a member of its state parliament. From 1949-52 he was East Germany's Minister of the Interior; his dismissal at the end of that time was arranged by Walter Ulbricht.

During that time, he was a member of the German People's Council (Deutscher Volksrat) from 1948–49, and from 1950 to 1954 a member of the Volkskammer. Within the SED, he was a member of the central committee of the SED from 1949-54. He also served as a professor of administrative law at Humboldt University in Berlin from 1949-55.

He received the Fatherland Order of Merit (Vaterländischer Verdienstorden), the honor clip (Ehrenspange) to the Fatherland Order of Merit, and the Order of Karl Marx.

He was the oldest former Minister-President of East Germany. Steinhoff was preceded by Wilhelm Höcker and succeeded by Max Seydewitz.

References 

1892 births
1981 deaths
People from Herford
People from the Province of Westphalia
Social Democratic Party of Germany politicians
Members of the Central Committee of the Socialist Unity Party of Germany
Government ministers of East Germany
Members of the Provisional Volkskammer
Ministers-President of Brandenburg
Members of the Landtag of Brandenburg
Academic staff of the Humboldt University of Berlin
Recipients of the Patriotic Order of Merit (honor clasp)